

Notes

References

Bibliography 

Government of Indonesia